Halászi (German: Fischerdorf) is a village in Győr-Moson-Sopron county, Hungary.

Populated places in Győr-Moson-Sopron County